Qaleh Bardi (also Romanized as Qal‘eh Bardī) is a village in Kushk Rural District, Abezhdan District, Andika County, Khuzestan Province, Iran. At the 2006 census, its population was 46, in 7 families.

References 

Populated places in Andika County